Bingley is a locality in Alberta, Canada.

The locality takes its name from Bingley, in England.

References 

Localities in Clearwater County, Alberta